Assortment is Atomic Rooster’s first compilation album, issued by Charisma Records in 1973. It is composed of tracks from its first three studio albums.

Track listing 
Side one
 "Devil's Answer" (John Du Cann) 3:29 
 "Sleeping for Years" (Du Cann) 5:30 
 "Friday the 13th" (Vincent Crane) 3:35 
 "I Can't Take No More" (Du Cann) 3:36 
 "Death Walks Behind You" (Cann, Crane) 7:24 
Side two
 "Tomorrow Night" (Crane) 4:02
 "Break the Ice"(Cann) 5:03
 "S.L.Y." (Crane) 4:46
 "The Price" (Crane, Darnell) 5:20
 "Decline and Fall" (Crane) 5:49

Personnel 
Atomic Rooster
 Vincent Crane - keyboards
 Nick Graham - bass, vocals on "Friday the Thirteen", "S.L.Y." and "Decline and Fall"
 John Du Cann - guitar, vocals on other tracks 
 Carl Palmer - drums on "Friday the Thirteen", "S.L.Y." and "Decline and Fall"
 Paul Hammond - drums on other tracks

References 
 https://www.discogs.com/fr/Atomic-Rooster-Assortment/release/865602

Atomic Rooster compilation albums
1973 compilation albums
Charisma Records compilation albums